The Henry B. Neef House is located just north of the Minne Lusa neighborhood of North Omaha, Nebraska, United States. The Neef House was the first steel-frame house in the area, and was a pioneering construction style in Nebraska.

It was built in 1929 by Henry Neef.

The building was listed on the U.S. National Register of Historic Places on September 16, 2010. The listing was announced as the featured listing in the National Park Service's weekly list of September 24, 2010.

References

Houses on the National Register of Historic Places in Omaha, Nebraska
Landmarks in North Omaha, Nebraska
Omaha Landmarks